The 8th Jutra Awards were held on March 19, 2006 to honour films made with the participation of the Quebec film industry in 2005. Nominations were announced on February 8.

Winners and nominees

References

2006 in Quebec
Jutra
08
Jutra